is a Japanese actor, tarento, and presenter. He is represented with Horipro.

He graduated from Nihon University Mishima High School and Nihon University College of Arts Film Department (in which he was classmates with Hiroyuki Sanada).

His father was Eiji Funakoshi, who was also an actor, and his mother was Yumiko Hasegawa. His great uncle was Kazuo Hasegawa (his wife Shige Iijima was Eiichiro's grandmother and their daughter was Matsu Iijima). His uncle was Ken Mishima (real name: Eitaro Funakoshi). His former wife is actress Kazuyo Matsui. His mother's great-grandfather was Jiro Iijima, founder of the Iijima Association, who formed a temporary name in railway construction. His sister was Yoko Hirano.

Filmography

Serial dramas

Two hour dramas
 Nippon TV

 TV Asahi

 Tokyo Broadcasting System

 TV Tokyo

 Fuji Television

Other dramas

Films

TV anime

Anime films

Video games

Dubbing

Variety/educational programmes
 Current

 Former

Music programmes

Music videos

Advertisements

Others

References

External links
 
 

Japanese television personalities
Japanese television presenters
Horipro artists
Nihon University alumni
Male actors from Kanagawa Prefecture
1960 births
Living people